Sajha Yatayat is a public transportation bus system in Nepal serving the capital city of Kathmandu as well as its surrounding valley. It mainly runs bus routes throughout Kathmandu and Lalitpur city. Since 2016 Sajha Yatayat has expanded its network and provides long haul bus service to Baglung, Gorkha, Birgunj and Lumbini.

Routes
Sajha Yatayat serves the following routs inside Kathmandu Valley:

Furthermore, there is currently one long haul route:

 
Sajha Yatayat Bus stops signs are put at most places. Regular bus stops are also used. In some bus stands, there are no bus stop signs yet due to constructions. Normal frequency of operation is 15 minutes to 25 minutes.

Electric Bus 
Sajha Yatayat signed a contract with Chinese Auto Manufacturer CHTC Kinwin for the delivery of 40 electric busses in Oct 09, 2021. Among those, 3 busses were delivered and were operational from July 7, 2022. They are currently running in trial phase and 37 more busses will be delivered soon

References

External links

 Official webpage

Transport companies established in 1962
Bus transport in Nepal
History of transport in Nepal
1962 establishments in Nepal